Brett "Noddy" Kimmorley (born 15 September 1976) is an Australian rugby league coach and former professional rugby league footballer who played in the 1990s and 2000s and is the current interim coach of the Wests Tigers. A New South Wales interstate and Australian international representative halfback, he last played for the Canterbury-Bankstown Bulldogs of the NRL. He previously played for five other clubs: Newcastle Knights, Hunter Mariners, Melbourne Storm, Northern Eagles and the Cronulla-Sutherland Sharks. Kimmorley also represented Country NSW four times and New South Wales ten times as well as playing 15 times for his country including the 2000 World Cup. He also played two Super League Tests. He retired at the end of the 2010 NRL season.

Early life
Brett played early football in the backyard with his brother, Craig, and then for the Lakes United Seagulls. Kimmorley was educated at Belmont High School, where he also represented 1994 Australian Schoolboys.

Playing career

1990s
Kimmorley made his first grade debut for the Newcastle Knights against Manly on 21 July 1995 at Energy Australia Stadium (then known as Marathon Stadium). In place of the injured Andrew Johns, Kimmorley got his first try in his second ever game.

After limited opportunities in first-grade at his favoured half-back position with the Knights (because of Andrew Johns), Kimmorley opted to sign for newly formed Super League club the Hunter Mariners who were also based out of Newcastle midway through the 1997 split season. Throughout 1997 the Mariners managed to make a seven win and reach the final of the 1997 World Club Championship. Kimmorley was the Mariners' only player selected to represent Australia in the three-test series against Great Britain at the end of the season.

With the shutting down of Super League in 1998 the Mariners were subsequently disbanded and with the newly formed National Rugby League starting up, Kimmorley was yet again on the move. He (along with several Mariners teammates) moved to newly formed entity the Melbourne Storm on a three-year deal. He played every game for the Storm in the 1998 season. His most memorable season for the Storm came in 1999 when he was named the club's player of the year He played at halfback for the Storm in the 1999 NRL Grand Final against the St George Illawarra Dragons. Melbourne claimed their maiden premiership, with Kimmorley leading a spirited Storm comeback and setting up the match-winning try with a chip-kick to earn the Clive Churchill medal for best on-ground. Kimmorley was selected for the Australian team to compete in the end of season 1999 Rugby League Tri-Nations tournament. In the final against New Zealand he played at halfback in the Kangaroos' 22–20 victory.

2000s
Having won the 1999 Premiership, the Melbourne Storm travelled to England to contest the 2000 World Club Challenge against Super League Champions St Helens R.F.C., with Kimmorley playing at halfback in the victory. In 2000 Kimmorley made his State of Origin debut for New South Wales, helping the Blues to a clean sweep, and keeping Johns on the bench for Games II and III. The following year he left Victoria for the Northern Eagles. He had an unhappy season, however, and when the merged entity split at the end of the season, he decided to follow his former Melbourne Storm coach Chris Anderson to the Cronulla-Sutherland Sharks (the club where he would spend the majority of his career, playing seven seasons between 2002–08) after being linked with a move to recently promoted English Super League club Widnes Vikings.

In his first season with his new club he somewhat flourished, setting a new club record for most points in a game against his former club, Newcastle, and led the Sharks to the preliminary final, although they lost (to eventual runners-up New Zealand Warriors). The season was marred by controversy as Chris Anderson dropped 2001 Dally M Medallist and club favourite Preston Campbell from the halfback position to accommodate Kimmorley, which resulted in Sharks fans' lukewarm reception of the Test halfback.

With the new season in 2003 looking promising, Kimmorley was awarded the captaincy of the team over David Peachey and was rewarded with a new five-year deal. At the end of the 2003 NRL season, he went on the 2003 Kangaroo tour of Great Britain and France, helping Australia to victory over Great Britain in what would be the last time the two nations contested an Ashes series. Kimmorley was pivotal to Australia's whitewashing with last-minute field goals to secure the first two games in the three game series.

2004 was a disappointing season for Kimmorley, who failed to take his club to the finals for a second consecutive season. He was also plagued with several injuries which caused him to miss the annual State of Origin series fixtures, although he was selected in the Australian team to go and compete in the end of season 2004 Rugby League Tri-Nations tournament. In the final against Great Britain Kimmorley played at half back in the Kangaroos' 44–4 victory.

The start of 2005 looked extremely promising for the club, with Cronulla and Kimmorley winning the first 6 games in a row to be on top of the NRL Ladder. However, after Kimmorley's selection for New South Wales Rugby League team in the first State of Origin match, in which he threw the fateful intercept ball to hand Queensland a victory, his confidence was seemingly shattered and his club form suffered badly. Only Cronulla's excellent first half of the season and favourable results prevented them from falling out of finals contention.

2006 was an unhappy one for Kimmorley, failing to regain his spot at halfback for both representative teams (New South Wales and Australia) the Sharks struggled to maintain their strong start to the season, plummeting from 2nd place on the ladder to lose 10 games in a row and finish 12th on the ladder.

In 2007, Kimmorley's chance for success improved mainly from the signing of new coach Ricky Stuart a former representative halfback himself. Kimmorley was selected as halfback for the 2007 New South Wales State of Origin team for games 2 and 3, after Jarrod Mullen was dropped due to injury.

Kimmorley was again linked with a move to the Widnes Vikings if they got into Super League, but this move did not go through.

Kimmorley agreed to move to the Canterbury-Bankstown Bulldogs on a two-year deal from the 2009 season. Kimmorley played a senior role at the club. Kimmorley was also in line for captain of the Bulldogs. On 26 August 2010 he announced his retirement from the NRL effective at the end of the season.

Playing statistics

Played over 300 career first grade games with six clubs
Has scored over 700 points including 82 career tries

Personal accolades 
Clive Churchill Medal: 1999

Dally M Halfback of The Year: 2000

Coaching career
Following his retirement, Kimmorley signed on as an assistant coach with the Bulldogs for 2011–12. In December 2012, he announced his move to the Canberra Raiders, signing a two-year deal, as David Furner's right-hand man. Kimmorley was head coach of the Wests Tigers Under 20s in 2015, making the second week of the finals. He departed the club shortly afterwards.

In 2022, following the termination of Michael Maguire at the Wests Tigers, Kimmorley was named as interim coach for the rest of the season.
In round 20, Kimmorley earned his first win as interim head coach with a shock 32-18 victory over Brisbane.  In round 23, Wests were beaten 72-6 by the Sydney Roosters which became the clubs heaviest ever defeat.

Media career
After retiring, Kimmorley joined Fox Sports as a commentator.  As of 2017, Kimmorley normally commentated 1-2 matches per round as a sideline commentator.  He also works as an NRL reporter for the Seven Network.

He will commentate on matches of the 2017 Rugby League World Cup for the Seven Network.

Personal life
Brett Kimmorley's wife, Sharnie, had a brain tumour and died on 23 March 2017.

References

External links 
NRL profile
 Brett Kimmorley's Official Profile
 State of Origin Official website Rugby League Player Stats

1976 births
Living people
Australia national rugby league team players
Australian rugby league coaches
Australian rugby league players
Newcastle Knights players
Hunter Mariners players
Melbourne Storm players
Northern Eagles players
Cronulla-Sutherland Sharks players
Canterbury-Bankstown Bulldogs players
New South Wales Rugby League State of Origin players
Country New South Wales Origin rugby league team players
Prime Minister's XIII players
Lakes United Seagulls players
Valentine-Eleebana Red Devils players
Clive Churchill Medal winners
Rugby league halfbacks
Rugby league players from Newcastle, New South Wales
Wests Tigers coaches